The 2017 FIA Formula 3 European Championship is a multi-event motor racing championship for third-tier single-seat open wheel formula racing cars that is held across Europe. The championship featured drivers competing in two-litre Formula Three racing cars which conform to the technical regulations, or formula, for the championship. It was the sixth edition of the FIA Formula 3 European Championship. 

The season saw the début of the Dallara F317 chassis package. Although it is only an aero-upgraded F312 chassis, the F317 was built as a replacement for the aging F312 chassis package which débuted in the first season of the championship back in 2012.

Prema Powerteam successfully defended the teams' championship for the fifth time in row. While the drivers' and rookies' title was secured with two races to spare by Carlin's driver Lando Norris. He became the first non-Prema driver to win the FIA Formula 3 European Championship. Joel Eriksson on his second year with Motopark improved his performance to the runner-up place in the standings. While Prema's Maximilian Günther was not able to get better in the championship, but remained in the top-three at the end of the season. His teammate Callum Ilott was the last driver who was a championship contender and won on the different types of circuits. Jake Hughes, Jehan Daruvala and Ferdinand Habsburg took their wins at Nürburgring, Norisring and Spa respectively. Guanyu Zhou, Ralf Aron and Nikita Mazepin completed the top-ten in the standings and all of them had more than one podium.

Teams and drivers
The following teams and drivers competed during the 2017 season:

Driver changes
Force India junior and 2016 Eurocup Formula Renault 2.0 driver Jehan Daruvala and 2016 Euroformula Open runner-up Ferdinand Habsburg joined the series with Carlin. 2016 Formula Renault 2.0 champion Lando Norris, who competed in the last round of the 2016 season with Carlin, raced full-time with the team. 2016 GP3 Series driver Jake Dennis returned to Carlin, with which he previously raced in the championship in 2014.  entered the series with Carlin.
Ralf Aron switched from Prema Powerteam to HitechGP. Jake Hughes, who competed in the final round of the 2016 season with Carlin, will race full-time with Hitech GP. They were joined by 2015 F4 Japanese runner-up Tadasuke Makino.
Italian F4 driver Marino Sato and Euroformula Open driver Keyvan Andres Soori joined the series with Motopark. Motopark driver Sérgio Sette Câmara stepped up to 2017 FIA Formula 2 Championship with MP Motorsport. Red Bull Junior driver Niko Kari, who finished tenth in the 2016 European Formula 3, competed in the GP3 Series with Arden International.
Callum Ilott and Guanyu Zhou, who raced for Van Amersfoort Racing and Motopark in 2016 respectively, switched to Prema Powerteam. Mick Schumacher, runner-up in the 2016 ADAC F4 and Italian F4 championships, and son of seven time Formula One world champion Michael Schumacher, joined the series with Prema Powerteam. 2016 champion Lance Stroll graduated to Formula One with Williams F1, leaving his Prema's seat vacant.
David Beckmann, who competed for Mücke Motorsport in 2016 from round 3 onwards, joined Van Amersfoort Racing. ADAC F4 champion Joey Mawson continued his collaboration with Van Amersfoort Racing. Anthoine Hubert and Mercedes F1 junior driver George Russell, who finished eighth and third in the 2016 European Formula 3 season respectively, joined the GP3 Series with ART Grand Prix.

Calendar
A provisional ten-round calendar was announced on 30 November 2016. The finalised calendar was announced on 16 December 2016.

Results

Championship standings
Scoring system

Drivers' championship

Rookies' Championship

Teams' championship
Prior to each round of the championship, two drivers from each team – if applicable – were nominated to score teams' championship points.

Footnotes

References

External links

FIA Formula 3 European Championship
European Championship
FIA Formula 3 European Championship
Formula 3